Gopi Sundar C. S. (born 30 May 1977) is an Indian music director, programmer, playback singer, songwriter, actor and performer who works prominently in Malayalam, Telugu and Tamil film industries. He started his career composing music for television commercials,  has nearly 5,000 jingles to his credit. As a keyboard programmer, he has collaborated with many music directors including the composer duo Vishal–Shekhar. He has won several accolades for his soundtrack albums and film scores, including a National Film Award, a Kerala State Film Award, and two Filmfare Awards South.

Sundar started his own recording label, Gopi Sundar Music Company in 2014 with an idea to promote aspiring musicians and to make low-budget productions possible. In 2016, he formed a live performance music band called "Band Big G" in Dubai. In 2017, his work in the film Pulimurugan was included in the contender list for the 90th Academy Awards nominations for Best Original Song and Best Original Score categories, but none were nominated.

Early life 
Born to Suresh Babu and Livi, Sundar spent a large part of his childhood in Kochi. His early interest in music started from working in his father's recording studio business and listening to the radio with his mother. During school days, Sundar was keener on playing the tabla and keyboard than studies. Eventually, when he got dropped out of school after failing his SSLC exams, his parents were supportive enough to let him pursue his dreams. Keen to make a career in music, he left for Chennai, where he took up classes at the Government Music College, but discontinued the course, feeling disillusioned.

Career

Early years 
His father, Suresh, helped him get into the Malayalam composer Ouseppachan's music troupe. Ouseppachan, a longtime friend of Sundar's father, took him as an assistant and became a mentor to the youngster. While on the team, Sundar worked his way up, playing tabla and keyboard, and began getting noticed for his composing skills as well. In an association that spanned more than a decade, Sundar assisted him with several works. In the years that he spent in Chennai, he struggled to find a foothold in the music industry. His first exposure to professional music came in the form of composing jingles for TV commercials. In those difficult days, his uncle Devan, an actor-politician in Malayalam films, helped him get a roof over his head. Sridhar Kariat, son of the legendary Malayalam filmmaker Ramu Kariat, showed him the ropes of how to stand out in the fast lane of advertising. In the world of the catchy jingle music of advertising, it took him seven years to create a niche for himself. His ever-growing repertoire consists of almost 5,000 jingles, a number of them advertising the work of filmmaker and feature film cinematographer Rajiv Menon. He has also done keyboard programming for the Bollywood music director duo Vishal–Shekhar, including for popular songs like "Ek Main Aur Ek Tu Hai" (Bluffmaster!), "Aankhon mein teri" (Om Shanti Om), and music for Taxi No. 9211.

2005–2012 
Sundar got his first break as a film score composer with Notebook, after the director Rosshan Andrews happened to notice his programming for the film Udayananu Tharam. The eventual success of the film catapulted him into the mainstream, with Sibi Malayil offering him the first contract for soundtrack composition for the Malayalam film Flash, starring Mohanlal. The turning point in his career was the film Big B, which was the debut feature of not only the director Amal Neerad but also a host of technicians including Sameer Thahir, Vivek Harshan, and Unni R. Although the film, which starred Mammooty, opened to mixed reviews, it was lauded for its technical finesse and for providing a film experience that was altogether new to the Malayalam cinema. Sundar's background score, which blended aptly with the tone of the film, escalating his popularity amongst the Malayali film audiences. Big B marked the beginning of Sundar's long-term association with Amal Neerad.

In 2008, Sundar made his Tamil film industry debut by composing the background score for the film Poi Solla Porom. He then went on to compose songs for a number of films and the film Sagar Alias Jackie Reloaded (2009), which starred Mohanlal, had him compose both the soundtrack and the film score. Despite the film being panned by critics and audiences alike, the songs were an instant hit. The first major award came his way for the film Anwar in 2010, for which he received the Filmfare Award for Best Music Director.

Casanovva (2012), a Malayalam romantic-thriller film, saw him reunite with Rosshan Andrrews. He shared music credits with Alphons Joseph and Gowri Lakshmi for the soundtrack. Although the audio rights were acquired by Satyam Audios at a record price of ₹12 million (US$190,000), the film had a disappointing run at the box office. His next major work that year was for Anwar Rasheed's film Ustad Hotel. The film won wide critical acclaim and was a commercial success. The film's five-song soundtrack went on to become one of his most popular soundtrack albums and received rave reviews from critics, audiences, and his contemporaries alike. "Appangalembadum", a quirky reworking of a popular but traditional Mappilappattu song crooned by Anna Katharina Valayil, was an instant hit following its radio release and eventually became one of the biggest hits of the year. It got him the year's Filmfare Award, Asianet Film Awards, SIIMA, and Kochi Times Awards for Best Music Direction, and a Pearl Award for Best Background Score. Music director Bijibal, picked the film score of Ustad Hotel as his favourite when asked to pick "the best contemporary background score of his choice".

2013–2015 
In 2013, he sang a melody called "Titli", tuned by Vishal–Shekhar along with Chinmayi and Srimathumitha, for the Bollywood film Chennai Express. The Rohit Shetty film, which also starred Shah Rukh Khan and Deepika Padukone, turned out to be one of the highest-grossing Indian films of all time. Sundar's subsequent films found commercial success, including the Dulquer Salmaan vehicle ABCD: American Born Confused Desi, Left Right Left, 5 Sundarikal, Vishuddhan, and Salalah Mobiles. With Salalah Mobiles, he made his acting debut, with a cameo appearance as a qawwali singer in the song "Rasoolallah". His fame increased with the release of his 2014 film titled 1983, a coming-of-age sports drama film which marked the debut of screenwriter-director Abrid Shine. The film, a tribute to cricketer Sachin Tendulkar, was the first successful film of 2014. The soundtrack of the film was also a success, and the track "Olanjali Kuruvi", sung by P.Jayachandran and Vani Jayaram, was a "chartbuster". "For maintaining the tempo of the film with an in-sync background score", Sundar received the National Film Award for Best Background Score from the President of India, Pranab Mukherjee, at Vigyan Bhavan, New Delhi.

Amongst a string of films he tuned, the classical fusion single "Sadaa Paalaya" sung by Sithara for the film Mr.Fraud, aced the charts. He also made a cameo appearance in the film, alongside Mohanlal. The film How Old are You?, which marked the comeback of Malayalam film actress Manju Warrier after a 14-year sabbatical, was his next major project. The film went on to become a success, and the soundtrack was equally appreciated by the audience. "Vijanathayil", a lilting melody from the film sung by Shreya Ghoshal, was a huge hit that won her the Best Female Playback Singer Award at the 62nd Annual Filmfare Awards.

Bangalore Days, a romantic comedy drama film directed by Anjali Menon, featuring an ensemble cast of the top Malayalam actors, was his next release. The five-song soundtrack was a success and has turned out to contain his most-liked tracks. He received a Filmfare Award for Best Music Director, an Asianet Film Award for Best Music Director, and a Vanitha Film Award for Best Music Director for the film. Also, the single "Ethu Kari Raavilum" from the film earned Haricharan a Filmfare Award for Best Male Playback Singer.

In September, Sundar did his first live concert at Swapnanagari, Kozhikode. The musical event, organised by the Film Employees Federation of Kerala, the Music Directors Union, and the D Cutz Film Company, was the first of a series of concerts that saw eight composers coming together for the first time to raise funds for the Cochin Haneefa Foundation, which helps struggling film artists. The concert series, titled Jamgraab, was made up of the first letters of the names of the eight music directors involved: Jassie Gift, Alphons Joseph, Mejo Joseph, Gopi Sundar, Rahul Raj, Anil Johnson, Afzal Yusuf, and Bijibal. Following a tremendous response from the music fans, they held a second gig in February 2015 at Sharjah Cricket Stadium, which was to be followed by a world tour across the cities in US, UK and Australia in coming years.

Sundar forayed into Telugu film industry with the film Malli Malli Idi Rani Roju, which fetched him many fans in Telangana and Andhra Pradesh. He further expanded his reach with his second Telugu film, Bale Bale Magadivoy, which was a success at the box office; the soundtrack amassed equally good reviews. Deepu Joseph of The Times of India gave the soundtrack album 3.5 out of 5 stars and called it an album that "has something in it for everyone and it sure to be a hit". The success earned him a nomination for the Best Music Director Telugu award at the 2016 SIIMA Awards.

Ennu Ninte Moideen, where he collaborated with M. Jayachandran and Ramesh Narayan in music direction, was his next. He did the background score and composed the song "Mukkathe Penne", a poignant melody that served as a paean to the timeless love of Moideen and Kanchanamala, portrayed in the film by actors Prithviraj Sukumaran and Parvathy, respectively. The lyrics to the minute song were penned by Mohammed Maqbool Mansoor, one of Sundar's main backing vocalists. The song was written and composed in less than five minutes, and they sang it themselves. The song captured the imagination of listeners as only a few songs in Malayalam ever had. The film was a success at the box office and was equally appreciated by the critics for adapting a real-life story "without compromising on the aesthetics of the medium". For "creating a haunting melodic composition", his collaborator, M. Jayachandran, received a National Film Award for Best Music Direction. His compositions for the film Charlie also went on to become a hit, and the single "Chundari Penne", crooned by Dulquar Salmaan, received wide recognition. He won two Best Music Director Awards for the film: one North American Film Award and one IIFA Award.

2016–present 
In 2016, Sundar composed the film score and seven-song soundtrack of the Telugu film Oopiri, which was simultaneously released in Tamil as Thozha. The film, which featured Nagarjuna was a commercial success, grossing over ₹1 billion (US$14.5 million) worldwide. The Times of India gave Oopiris soundtrack four stars, calling it a "winner on all counts and Gopi Sundar is increasingly becoming a force to be reckon with in Tollywood". Sundar composed the soundtrack and film score for the film Pulimurugan, which is currently the highest-grossing film in the Malayalam film industry. The Times of India critic Sanjith Surendran praised Sundar's "rousing theme music that made the 161-minute runtime a breeze". The two songs ("Kaadanayum Kaalchilambe" and "Maanathe Maarikurumbe") and the film score of Pulimurugan were selected by the Academy of Motion Picture Arts and Sciences to contend in the 90th Academy Awards nominations for the Best Original Song and Best Original Score categories. Including Pulimurugan, a total of 70 original songs and 141 original scores were selected in that year. He won a Best Music Director award for the film from the Asiavision Awards, while K.S Chitra won the Best Female Singer Award for the song "Kaadaniyum Kalchilambe", along with a South Indian International Movie Awards for Best Playback Singer Female. Vani Jairam won the Best Female Singer award for the song "Manathe Marikurumbe" from the same film.

Sundar composed the background score for the Tamil musical comedy horror film Devi, which was simultaneously shot and released in Telugu and Hindi as Abhinetri and Tutak Tutak Tutiya, respectively. For Premam, the Telugu remake of the Malayalam film of the same name he collaborated with Rajesh Murugesan, the music director of the original Malayalam film. The film received positive reviews upon release in Telangana. Behindwoods lauded the soundtrack album for "staying true to the original, yet exploring better nuances of music". Sundar composed the only two songs for the Mammootty vehicle The Great Father (2017). Comrade in America, a Malayalam romantic comedy film, saw him reunite with his long-time collaborator, Amal Neerad. The three-song soundtrack, of which two songs were sung by the actor Dulquar Salmaan, was released under Sundar's own record label, Gopi Sundar Music Company. The single "Adiga Adiga" from the Telugu film Ninnu Kori, which was released in July was a hit. Having finished working on Role Models, Tiyaan, Chunkzz, and Udaharanam Sujatha, which garnered good response, his upcoming projects include Kammara Sambhavam and Kayamkulam Kochunni. He won his first Kerala State Film Award for Best Background Music in 2017 for the film Take Off, and his song "Vaanamakalunnuvo" from the film Vimaanam got Sithara her second Kerala State Film Award for Best Singer. His songs from the movie Geetha Govindam also received praise. His latest music work is present in the upcoming film Amala directed by Nishad Ebrahim and Mascot Productions.

Frequent collaborators 
Sundar has been the most frequent collaborator for films directed by Rosshan Andrrews. He has also frequently associated with Amal Neerad, Arun Kumar Aravind, Vysakh, along with screenwriter duo Bobby–Sanjay and Murali Gopy. Most of the lyrics for the songs composed by him are penned by Rafeeq Ahamed. However, he has also collaborated extensively with lyricists Santhosh Varma and B.K Harinarayanan.

Other ventures

Music band 
Gopi Sundar launched "Band Big G", his own music band, in 2016 in front of a capacity crowd at Al Nasr Leisureland, Dubai. The band is a live performance music band with a revolving quota of vocalists and instrumentalists, with Sundar as the only permanent member. The types of songs are decided depending on the audience and the event. The first gig consisted of an ensemble of Malayalam singers Afsal, Sithara, Najim Arshad, Haricharan, Divya S. Menon, Ramsi, Kavya Ajit, and Sruthi Lakshmi{phanivardhan}.They played a fusion compilation of Sundar's own compositions along with old Malayalam classics.

Recording studio 
Sunsa Digital Workstation is Sundar's music recording studio. It is a state of the art studio primarily located in Chennai, which is used by Sundar for recording his compositions. Sundar opened his second studio in Kochi. The recording studio was featured in Discovery Channel's TV Show India My Way] in 2017. As a part of the all-India tour for their programme, the hosts – model-turned-actor Paloma Monappa and Meeraj – visited the place while the song recording for the film Comrade in America was in progress. The show also features Amal Neerad, Dulquer Salmaan, and Sundar himself giving insights into the new wave of Malayalam cinema.

Music label 
Gopi Sundar launched his own record label, Gopi Sundar Music Company, in 2014. The label aims to support aspiring filmmakers and promising low-budget films by producing the music while retaining the copyrights of the work. It also looks to provide creative and talented artists a platform for independent music creation and licensing. The soundtrack album for the Malayalam film Last Supper was the first to be released under the aegis of the label, followed by several films, with Comrade in America being the latest.

Personal life 
Gopi Sundar married Priya and the couple have two children: Madhav and Yadhav. Priya and Sundar got separated and their divorce case is still in court. Sundar entered in a live-in relationship with singer Abhaya Hiranmayi, and in July 2018, he revealed that they had been together for 9 years. On 26 May 2022, he announced through social media that he is in a relationship with singer Amrutha Suresh and shared a picture of them together as well on his instagram account.

Discography

As composer

As playback singer

Filmography

Television

Awards and nominations

References

External links 
 
 

Living people
Jingle composers
Telugu film score composers
Telugu playback singers
Malayalam film score composers
Tamil film score composers
Indian male playback singers
Malayalam playback singers
Musicians from Kochi
Film musicians from Kerala
Tamil musicians
Bollywood playback singers
21st-century Indian composers
Best Background Score National Film Award winners
Filmfare Awards South winners
Zee Cine Awards Telugu winners
21st-century Indian singers
Indian male film score composers
21st-century Indian male singers
1977 births
South Indian International Movie Awards winners
Kerala State Film Award winners